HMS Dreadnought  was a 52-gun third-rate ship of the line, in service with the Royal Navy from 1660 to 1690.

The ship was originally launched in 1654 under the name Torrington for the navy of the Commonwealth of England. Her builder was shipwright Henry Johnson at Blackwall Yard, London. She was named for the Parliamentarian victory at the Battle of Torrington in 1646.

She was renamed Dreadnought after the Restoration in 1660. By 1677 her armament had been increased to 62 guns.

After an active career in both the Second Dutch War and Third Dutch War, Dreadnought foundered at sea in October 1690.

Notes

References

Lavery, Brian (2003) The Ship of the Line - Volume 1: The development of the battlefleet 1650-1850. Conway Maritime Press. .
Winfield, Rif (2009) British Warships in the Age of Sail 1603-1714: Design, Construction, Careers and Fates. Seaforth Publishing. .

Ships of the line of the Royal Navy
Ships built by the Blackwall Yard
Shipwrecks
1650s ships
Maritime incidents in 1690
Speaker-class ships of the line